Asher Iyasu (born in Ethiopia) is an Israeli golfer who was the first golfer to win the Caesarea Golf & Country Club's tournament from the Beta Israel community. His first real success came in a doubles tournament in which he won with a top blind golfer, Israel's only blind golfer, Zohar Sharon. The second was with the son of the famous writer Yigal Mossinson, Humi.

Notes and references

Year of birth missing (living people)
Living people
Ethiopian Jews
Ethiopian emigrants to Israel
Citizens of Israel through Law of Return
Israeli male golfers
Jewish Israeli sportspeople
Jewish golfers